Football Club Urartu (translated Futbolayin Akumb Urartu), commonly known as Urartu, is an Armenian professional football team based in the capital Yerevan that currently plays in the Armenian Premier League. The club won the Armenian Cup three times, in 1992, 2007 and 2016. In 2013–2014, they won the Armenian Premier League for the first time in their history.

In early 2016, the Russia-based Armenian businessman Dzhevan Cheloyants became a co-owner of the club after purchasing the major part of the club shares. The club was known as FC Banants until 1 August 2019, when it was officially renamed FC Urartu.

History

Kotayk
Urartu FC were founded as FC Banants by Sarkis Israelyan on 21 January 1992 in the village of Kotayk, representing the Kotayk Province. He named the club after his native village of Banants (currently known as Bayan). Between 1992 and 1995, the club was commonly referred to as Banants Kotayk. During the 1992 season, the club won the first Armenian Cup. At the end of the 1995 transitional season, Banants suffered a financial crisis. The club owners decided that it was better to merge the club with FC Kotayk of Abovyan, rather than disband it. In 2001, Banants demerged from FC Kotayk, and was moved from Abovyan to the capital Yerevan.

Yerevan

FC Banants was relocated to Yerevan in 2001. At the beginning of 2003, Banants merged with FC Spartak Yerevan, but was able to limit the name of the new merger to FC Banants. Spartak became Banants's youth academy and later changed the name to Banants-2. Because of the merger, Banants acquired many players from Spartak Yerevan, including Samvel Melkonyan. After the merger, Banants took a more serious approach and have finished highly in the league table ever since. The club managed to lift the Armenian Cup in 2007.
Experience is making way for youth for the 2008 and 2009 seasons. The departures of most of the experienced players have left the club's future to the youth. Along with two Ukrainian players, Ugandan international, Noah Kasule, has been signed.

The club headquarters are located on Jivani Street 2 of the Malatia-Sebastia District, Yerevan.

Domestic

European

Stadium

The construction of the Banants Stadium was launched in 2006 in the Malatia-Sebastia District of Yerevan, with the assistance of the FIFA goal programme. It was officially opened in 2008 with a capacity of 3,600 seats. Further developments were implemented later in 2011, when the playing pitch was modernized and the capacity of the stadium was increased up to 4,860 seats (2,760 at the northern stand, 1,500 at the southern stand and 600 at the western stand).

Training centre/academy
Banants Training Centre is the club's academy base located in the Malatia-Sebastia District of Yerevan. In addition to the main stadium, the centre houses 3 full-size training pitches, mini football pitches as well as an indoor facility. The current technical director of the academy is the former Russian footballer Ilshat Faizulin.

Fans
The most active group of fans is the South West Ultras fan club, mainly composed of residents from several neighbourhoods within the Malatia-Sebastia District of Yerevan, since the club is a de facto representer of the district. Members of the fan club benefit from events organized by the club and many facilities of the Banants training centre, such as the mini football pitch, the club store and other entertainments.

Achievements
 Armenian Premier League
 Winner (1): 2013–14.
 Runner-up (5): 2003, 2006, 2007, 2010, 2018.

 Armenian Cup
 Winner (3): 1992, 2007, 2016.
 Runner-up (6): 2003, 2004, 2008, 2009, 2010, 2021–22

 Armenian Supercup
 Winner (1): 2014.
 Runner-up (5): 2004, 2007, 2009, 2010, 2016.

Current squad

Out on loan

Personnel

Technical staff

Management

Urartu-2

FC Banants' reserve squad play as FC Banants-2 in the Armenian First League. They play their home games at the training field with artificial turf of the Urartu Training Centre.

Managerial history
 Varuzhan Sukiasyan (1992–94)
 Poghos Galstyan (July 1, 1996 – June 30, 1998)
 Oganes Zanazanyan (2001–05)
 Ashot Barseghyan (2005–06)
 Nikolay Kiselyov (2006–07)
 Jan Poštulka (2007)
 Nikolay Kostov (July 1, 2007 – April 8, 2008)
 Nedelcho Matushev (April 8, 2008 – June 30, 2008)
 Kim Splidsboel (2008)
 Armen Gyulbudaghyants (Jan 1, 2009 – Dec 1, 2009)
 Ashot Barseghyan (interim) (2009)
 Stevica Kuzmanovski (Jan 1, 2010 – Dec 31, 2010)
 Rafael Nazaryan (Jan 1, 2011 – Jan 15, 2012)
 Volodymyr Pyatenko (Jan 17, 2013 – June 30, 2013)
 Zsolt Hornyák (July 1, 2013 – May 30, 2015)
 Aram Voskanyan (July 1, 2015 – Oct 11, 2015)
 Tito Ramallo (Oct 12, 2015 – Oct 3, 2016)
 Artur Voskanyan (Oct 3, 2016 – Aug 11, 2018)
 Ilshat Faizulin (Aug 12, 2018 –Nov 24, 2019)
 Aleksandr Grigoryan (Nov 25, 2019 –Mar 10, 2021)
 Robert Arzumanyan (10 March 2021–24 June 2022)
 Dmitri Gunko (27 June 2022–)

References

External links
 Official website 
 Banants at Weltfussball.de  

 
Urartu
Urartu
Urartu
Urartu